Zugno is a surname. Notable people with the surname include:

 Anna Zugno (born 1984), Italian road cyclist
 Francesco Zugno ( 1708–1787), Italian painter of the Rococo period 

Italian-language surnames